Leucopogon brevicuspis is a species of flowering plant in the heath family Ericaceae and is endemic to the south-west of Western Australia. The flowers are arranged in groups of two or three in leaf axils with small bracts and bracteoles about half as long as the sepals.

It was first formally described in 1868 by George Bentham in Flora Australiensis. The specific epithet (bracteolaris) means "short point". 

This leucopogon occurs in the Jarrah Forest bioregion of the south-west of Western Australia and is listed (as Styphelia brevicuspis) as "Priority Two" by the Western Australian Government Department of Biodiversity, Conservation and Attractions, meaning that it is poorly known and from only one or a few locations.

References

brevicuspis
Ericales of Australia
Flora of Western Australia
Plants described in 1868
Taxa named by George Bentham